The Cooker is an album by jazz trumpeter Lee Morgan, released on the Blue Note label in January 1958. It was recorded on September 29, 1957, and features a quintet with Morgan, Pepper Adams, Bobby Timmons, Paul Chambers and Philly Joe Jones.

Recorded and released while Morgan was still just nineteen years old, The Cooker is the first album to feature his own original compositions, as well as the first without any compositions written by Benny Golson.

Music
The Cooker is considered to demonstrate Morgan's early bebop virtuosity, with frequent double time improvisational lines. It is also noted for performance trademarks which would later come to typify Morgan's style, such as clipped notes, upward slurs, half-valving, and triple-tonguing.

On the bebop standard "A Night in Tunisia", Morgan avoids being compared with Charlie Parker's famous 4-bar break on the piece by not playing during it; he then plays a rapid solo that is mostly in double time. The second track, Morgan's composition "Heavy Dipper," is "an infectious, medium-tempo swinger." "Just One of Those Things" is another up-tempo piece. "Lover Man" is a ballad.

Reception
The Allmusic review by Scott Yanow states: "Morgan plays remarkably well for his age (already ranking just below Dizzy Gillespie and Miles Davis), making this an essential acquisition."

Track listing 
 "A Night in Tunisia" (Gillespie, Paparelli) – 9:24
 "Heavy Dipper" (Morgan) – 7:05
 "Just One of Those Things" (Porter) – 7:18
 "Lover Man" (Davis, Ramirez, Sherman) – 6:50
 "New-Ma" (Morgan) – 8:14
 "Just One of Those Things" [Alternate Take] – 7:50 Bonus track on CD

Personnel 
 Lee Morgan – trumpet
 Pepper Adams – baritone saxophone
 Bobby Timmons – piano
 Paul Chambers – double bass
 Philly Joe Jones – drums

References 

1958 albums
Albums produced by Alfred Lion
Albums recorded at Van Gelder Studio
Blue Note Records albums
Hard bop albums
Lee Morgan albums